Shurraf (Al Shurraf, Ash-Shurraf) is a desert town in Al Wahat District, Cyrenaica region, in northeastern Libya.

From 2001 to 2007 it was part of Ajdabiya District.  Formerly (1983-1987) it was part of the Jalu District (baladiyah).

References

Populated places in Al Wahat District
Cyrenaica